Valens (328 – 9 August 378) was Roman emperor from 364 to 378. Following a largely unremarkable military career, he was named co-emperor by his elder brother Valentinian I, who gave him the eastern half of the Roman Empire to rule. In 378, Valens was defeated and killed at the Battle of Adrianople against the invading Goths, which astonished contemporaries and marked the beginning of barbarian encroachment into Roman territory.

As emperor, Valens continually faced threats both internal and external. He defeated, after some dithering, the usurper Procopius in 366, and campaigned against the Goths across the Danube in 367 and 369. In the following years, Valens focused on the eastern frontier, where he faced the perennial threat of Persia, particularly in Armenia, as well as additional conflicts with the Saracens and Isaurians. Domestically, he inaugurated the Aqueduct of Valens in Constantinople, which was longer than all the aqueducts of Rome. In 376–77, the Gothic War broke out, following a mismanaged attempt to settle the Goths in the Balkans. Valens returned from the east to fight the Goths in person, but lack of coordination with his nephew, the western emperor Gratian (Valentinian I's son), as well as poor battle tactics, led to Valens and much of the eastern Roman army dying at a battle near Adrianople in 378.

Although Valens is described as indecisive, impressionable, a mediocre general and overall "utterly undistinguished", he was nonetheless a conscientious and capable administrator, and a notable achievement of his was to significantly relieve the burden of taxation on the population. At the same time, his suspicious and fearful disposition, and excessive concern for personal safety, resulted in numerous treason trials and executions, which heavily stained his reputation. In religious matters, Valens favored a compromise between Nicene Christianity and the various non-trinitarian Christian sects, and interfered little in the affairs of the pagans.

Early life and military career 

Valens and his brother Valentinian were born, in 328 and 321 respectively, to an Illyrian family resident in Cibalae (Vinkovci) in Pannonia Secunda. Their father Gratianus Funarius, a native of Cibalae, had served as a senior officer in the Roman army and as comes Africae. The brothers grew up on estates purchased by Gratianus in Africa and Britain. Both were Christians, but favored different sects: Valentinian was a Nicene Christian and Valens was an Arian Christian (a "Homoean"). In adulthood, Valens served in the protectores domestici under the emperors Julian and Jovian. According to the 5th-century Greek historian Socrates Scholasticus, Valens refused pressure to offer pagan sacrifices during the reign of the polytheist emperor Julian.

Valens's elder brother Valentinian also joined the protectores, rising to tribunus in 357; he served in Gaul and in Mesopotamia during the reign of Constantius II. According to the Chronicle of Jerome and the Chronicon Paschale, Valens's eldest nephew Gratian was born in 359 at Sirmium (Sremska Mitrovica) to Valentinian's wife Marina Severa.

Julian was killed in battle against the Persians in June 363, and his successor Jovian hastened towards Constantinople to secure his claim to the purple. Before reaching the capital, Jovian died unexpectedly at Dadastana in February 364. During his brief reign, he had given Valentinian the rank of tribunus scholae secundiae scutariorum.

The Latin historian Ammianus Marcellinus relates that Valentinian was summoned to Nicaea by a council of military and civil officials, who acclaimed him augustus. According to the Consularia Constantinopolitana and the Chronicon Paschale, the date of his elevation was 25 February 364.

Accession 
Valentinian appointed his brother Valens tribunus stabulorum (or stabuli) on 1 March 364 and both brothers became Roman consul for the first time. It was the general opinion that Valentinian needed help to handle the administration, civil and military, of the large and unwieldy empire, and, on 28 March of the same year, at the express demand of the soldiers for a second augustus, he selected his brother Valens as co-emperor at the Hebdomon, before the Constantinian Walls.

Early reign 
Both emperors were briefly ill, delaying them in Constantinople. As soon as they recovered, the two augusti travelled together through Adrianople and Naissus to Mediana, where they divided their territories. Valens obtained the eastern half of the Empire: Greece, the Balkans, Egypt, Anatolia and the Levant as far as the border with the Sasanian Empire. Valentinian took the western half, where the Alemannic wars required his immediate attention. The brothers began their consulships in their respective capitals, Constantinople and Mediolanum (Milan). Valens's wife Domnica may have become augusta in 364.

In the summer of 365, the 365 Crete earthquake and ensuing tsunami caused destruction around the Eastern Mediterranean.

The empire had recently retreated from most of its holdings in Mesopotamia and Armenia, because of a treaty that Jovian had made with Shapur II of the Sasanian Empire. Valens's first priority after the winter of 365 was to move east in hopes of shoring up the situation.

Usurpation of Procopius (365–366) 
With Valens absent from the imperial city, Procopius, a maternal cousin of Julian, declared himself augustus on 28 September 365. Procopius had held office under Constantius II and Julian, and, according to Zosimus, may have been Julian's intended successor. Jovian, aside from depriving him of his command, took no measures against this potential rival, but Valentinian regarded Procopius with hostility. Procopius met the danger from the new emperors with his own bid for power, emphasizing his connection to the revered Constantinian Dynasty: during his public appearances he was always accompanied by Constantia, the posthumous daughter of Constantius II, and her mother Faustina, the dowager empress. Recent tax increases, and Valens' dismissal of Julian's popular minister Salutius, contributed to a general disaffection and to the acceptability of a revolution.

News of the revolt reached Valens at Caesarea in Cappadocia (Kayseri), after most of his troops had already crossed the Cilician Gates into Syria. His first reaction was despair, and he considered abdication and perhaps even suicide. Procopius quickly gained control of the provinces of Asia and Bithynia, winning increasing support for his insurrection. Valens recovered his nerve and sent an army to Constantinople; according to Ammianus Marcellinus, the soldiers defected to Procopius, whose use of his Constantinian hostages had met with some success. 

Having reappointed Salutius, Valens dispatched more troops under veteran generals, Arinthaeus and Arbitio, to march on Procopius. According to Ammianus Marcellinus and the later Greek historians Socrates Scholasticus and Sozomen, the forces of Valens eventually prevailed after eight months, defeating Procopius in battles at Thyatira and Nacoleia. On both occasions, Procopius was deserted by his own following in fear of their adversaries' formidable commanders. Put on trial by members of his own escort, Procopius was executed on 27 May 366. Ammianus Marcellinus relates that Procopius's relative Marcellus was proclaimed emperor in his place, but according to Zosimus he was swiftly captured and executed. Valens could turn his attention back to external enemies, the Sasanian Empire and the Goths.

Formation of the Valentinianic dynasty 
According to the Consularia Constantinopolitana, Valens's son Valentinianus Galates was born on 18 January 366. The same year, Valens's nephew Gratian was appointed consul and given the title nobilissimus puer. A severe illness in 367 encouraged Valentinian to appoint a successor, and he named the eight-year-old Gratian his co-augustus on 24 August. In 368 Valentinian and Valens were consuls for the second time.

Currency reforms 

Beginning between 365 and 368, Valentinian and Valens reformed the precious metal coins of the Roman currency, decreeing that all bullion be melted down in the central imperial treasury before minting. Valentinian improved tax collection and was frugal in spending.

First Gothic War: 367–369 

During Procopius's insurrection, the Gothic king Ermanaric, who ruled a powerful kingdom north of the Danube from the Euxine to the Baltic Sea, had engaged to supply him with troops for the struggle against Valens. The Gothic army, reportedly numbering 30,000 men, arrived too late to help Procopius, but nevertheless invaded Thrace and began plundering the farms and vineyards of the province. Valens, marching north after defeating Procopius, surrounded them with a superior force and forced them to surrender. Ermanaric protested, and when Valens, encouraged by Valentinian, refused to make atonement to the Goths for his conduct, war was declared.

In spring 367, Valens crossed the Danube and attacked the Visigoths under Athanaric, Ermanaric's tributary. The Goths fled into the Carpathian Mountains, and the campaign ended with no decisive conclusion. The following spring, a Danube flood prevented Valens from crossing; instead the Emperor occupied his troops with the construction of fortifications. In 369, Valens crossed again, from Noviodunum, and by devastating the country forced Athanaric into giving battle. Valens was victorious, and took the title Gothicus Maximus in time for the celebration of his quinquennalia. Athanaric and his forces were able to withdraw in good order and pleaded for peace.

Fortunately for the Goths, Valens expected a new war with the Sasanid Empire in the Middle East and was therefore willing to come to terms. In early 370 Valens and Athanaric met in the middle of the Danube and agreed to a treaty that ended the war. The treaty seems to have largely cut off relations between Goths and Romans, confining trade and the exchange of troops for tribute.

Middle reign: 369–373 
In 369, Valentinianus Galates was made consul for the first time; he is also known to have been titled nobilissimus puer. Around 370 Galates died of illness, in Caesarea in Cappadocia (Kayseri).

Valentinian and Valens were consuls for the third time in 370. On 9 April 370, according to the Consularia Constantinopolitana and the Chronicon Paschale, the Church of the Holy Apostles adjoining the Mausoleum of Constantine in Constantinople was inaugurated.

Valens's sister-in-law Marina Severa died in the same year, and Valentinian married Justina in her place. In autumn 371, Valens's second nephew, also called Valentinian, was born to Justina, possibly at Augusta Treverorum (Trier). Gratian, who was then 15, was married in 374 to Constantius II's 13-year-old daughter Constantia at Trier. Constantia and Justina were both related to the house of Constantine, and the marriages linked the Valentinianic and Constantinian dynasties.

Valens celebrated his decennalia on 29 March 374. In 375, the Baths of Carosa – named for Valens's daughter Carosa – were inaugurated in Constantinople. Valens headed east after defeating the Goths, and began to prepare an attack on Persia, which threatened Armenia, in 375. Valens was distracted from his campaign against the Sasanians by wars against the Saracens and the Isaurians.

Persian War: 373 
As mentioned before, among Valens' reasons for contracting a hasty and not entirely favorable peace in 369 was the deteriorating state of affairs in the East. Jovian had surrendered Rome's much disputed claim to control over Armenia in 363, and Shapur II was eager to make good on this new opportunity. The Persian emperor began enticing Armenian lords over to his camp and eventually forced the defection of the Arsacid Armenian king, Arshak II (Arsaces II), whom he quickly arrested and incarcerated. The Armenian nobility responded by asking Valens to return Arshak's son, Pap. Valens agreed and sent Pap back to Armenia, but as these events took place during the war with the Goths he could not support him militarily. In response to the return of Pap, Shapur personally led an invasion force to seize control of Armenia. Pap and his followers took refuge in the mountains while Artaxata, the Armenian capital, and the city of Artogerassa along with several strongholds and castles were destroyed. Shapur sent a second invasion force to Caucasian Iberia to drive out the pro-Roman king Sauromaces II, and put his own appointee, Sauromaces's uncle Aspacures II on the throne.

In the summer following his Gothic settlement, Valens sent his magister peditum (Master of Foot) Arinthaeus to support Pap. The following spring a force of twelve legions were sent under Terentius to regain Iberia and to garrison Armenia near Mount Npat. When Shapur counterattacked into Armenia in 371, his forces were bested by Valens' generals Traianus and Vadomarius and the Armenian sparapet (general) Mushegh Mamikonian at Bagavan and Gandzak. Valens had overstepped the 363 treaty and then successfully defended his transgression. A truce settled after the 371 victory held as a quasi-peace for the next five years while Shapur was forced to deal with a Kushan invasion on his eastern frontier.

Meanwhile, troubles broke out with the boy-king Pap, who purportedly had the Armenian patriarch Nerses assassinated and demanded control of a number of Roman cities, including Edessa. Controversy also ensued over the issue of the appointment of a new patriarch of Armenia, with Pap appointing a candidate without the traditional approval from Caesarea. Pressed by his generals and fearing that Pap would defect to the Persians, Valens made an unsuccessful attempt to capture the prince and later had him executed inside Armenia. In his stead, Valens imposed another Arsacid, Varazdat, who ruled under the regency of the sparapet Mushegh Mamikonian, a friend of Rome.

None of this sat well with the Persians, who began agitating again for compliance with the 363 treaty. As the eastern frontier heated up in 375, Valens began preparations for a major expedition. Meanwhile, trouble was brewing elsewhere. In Isauria, the mountainous region of western Cilicia, a major revolt had broken out in 375 which diverted troops formerly stationed in the East. Furthermore, by 377, the Saracens under Queen Mavia had broken into revolt and devastated a swath of territory stretching from Phoenicia and Palestine as far as the Sinai. Though Valens successfully brought both uprisings under control, the opportunities for action on the eastern frontier were limited by these skirmishes closer to home.

Later reign: 373–376 
Valens became the senior augustus when his older brother Valentinian died at Brigetio (Szőny) on 17 November 375 while on campaign against the Quadi in Pannonia. He may have died of stroke. His body was prepared for burial and started its journey to Constantinople, where it arrived the following year. Gratian was then the only augustus in the western empire, though certain among Valentinian's generals promoted his four-year-old second son Valentinian II, whom the army on the Danube acclaimed augustus at Aquincum (Budapest), despite Gratian's existing prerogatives. Valentinian's courtiers and his Arian Christian widow Justina still had been holding great influence. Valens and Valentinian II were consuls for the year 376, Valens's fifth consulship.

The late augustus Valentinian's body arrived in Constantinople on 28 December 376, but was not yet buried.

Second Gothic War: 376–378 

Migrations of the Huns began to displace the Goths, who sought Roman protection. Valens allowed the Goths led by Fritigern to cross the Danube, but the Gothic settlers were abused by Roman officials and revolted in 377, seeking help from the Huns and the Alans and beginning the Gothic War (376–382).

Valens's sixth consulship was in 378, again jointly with Valentinian II. Valens returned from the east to campaign against the Goths. Gratian fought a war with the Alamanni in early summer 378. Valens asked for assistance from his nephew and co-emperor Gratian against the Goths in Thrace, and Gratian set out eastwards, though Valens did not wait for the western armies to arrive before taking the offensive.

Valens' plans for an eastern campaign were never realized. A transfer of troops to the Western Empire in 374 had left gaps in Valens' mobile forces. In preparation for an eastern war, Valens initiated an ambitious recruitment program designed to fill those gaps. It was thus not entirely unwelcome news when Valens heard of Ermanaric's death and the disintegration of his kingdom before an invasion of hordes of barbaric Huns from the far east. After failing to hold the Dniester or the Prut rivers against the Huns, the Goths retreated southward in a massive emigration, seeking new settlements and shelter south of the Danube, i.e. Roman lands, which they may have thought could be held against the enemy. In 376, the Visigoths under their leader Fritigern advanced to the far shores of the lower Danube and sent an ambassador to Valens who had set up his capital in Antioch, and requested asylum.

As Valens' advisers were quick to point out, these Goths could supply troops who would at once swell Valens' ranks and decrease his dependence on conscription from provinces—thereby increasing revenues from the recruitment tax. However, it would mean hiring them and paying in gold or silver for their services. Fritigern had enjoyed contact with Valens in the 370s when Valens supported him in a struggle against Athanaric stemming from Athanaric's persecution of Gothic Christians. Though a number of Gothic groups apparently requested entry, Valens granted admission only to Fritigern and his followers. Others would soon follow, however.

When Fritigern and his Goths, to the number of 200,000 warriors and almost a million all told, crossed the Danube, Valens's mobile forces were tied down in the east, on the Persian frontier (Valens was attempting to withdraw from the harsh terms imposed by Shapur and was meeting some resistance on the latter's part). This meant that only limitanei units were present to oversee the Goths' settlement. The small number of imperial troops present prevented the Romans from stopping a Danube crossing by a group of Ostrogoths and yet later on by Huns and Alans. What started out as a controlled resettlement might any moment turn into a major invasion. But the situation was worsened by corruption in the Roman administration, as Valens' generals accepted bribes rather than depriving the Goths of their weapons as Valens had stipulated and then proceeded to enrage them by such exorbitant prices for food that they were soon driven to the last extremity. Meanwhile, the Romans failed to prevent the crossing of other barbarians who were not included in the treaty. In early 377 the Goths revolted after a commotion with the people of Marcianopolis, and defeated the corrupt Roman governor Lupicinus near the city at the Battle of Marcianople.

After joining forces with the Ostrogoths under Alatheus and Saphrax who had crossed without Valens' consent, the combined barbarian group spread out to devastate the country before combining to meet Roman advance forces under Traianus and Richomeres. In a sanguinary battle at Ad Salices, the Goths were momentarily checked, and Saturninus, now Valens' lieutenant in the province, undertook a strategy of hemming them in between the lower Danube and the Euxine, hoping to starve them into surrender. However, Fritigern forced him to retreat by inviting some of the Huns to cross the river in the rear of Saturninus's ranged defenses. The Romans then fell back, incapable of containing the irruption, though with an elite force of his best soldiers the general Sebastian was able to fall upon and destroy several of the smaller predatory bands. By 378, Valens himself was ready to march west from his eastern base in Antioch. He withdrew all but a skeletal force—some of them Goths—from the east and moved west, reaching Constantinople by 30 May, 378. Valens' councillors, comes  Richomeres, and his generals Frigeridus and Victor cautioned Valens to wait for the arrival of Gratian with his troops from Roman Gaul, fresh from defeating the Alemanni, and Gratian himself strenuously urged this prudent course in his letters. But meanwhile the citizens of Constantinople were clamouring for the emperor to march against the enemy whom he had himself introduced into the Empire, and jeering the contrast between himself and his co-augustus. Valens decided to advance at once and win a victory on his own.

Battle of Adrianople 

According to the Latin historians Ammianus Marcellinus and Paulus Orosius, on 9 August 378, Valens and most of his army were killed fighting the Goths at the Battle of Adrianople, near Hadrianopolis in Thrace (Adrianople, Edirne).

After a brief stay aimed at building his troop strength and gaining a toehold in Thrace, Valens moved out to Adrianople. From there, he marched against the confederated barbarian army on 9 August 378 in what would become known as the Battle of Adrianople. Although negotiations were attempted, these broke down when a Roman unit sallied forth and carried both sides into battle. The Romans held their own early on but were crushed by the surprise arrival of Visigoth cavalry which split their ranks.

The primary source for the battle is Ammianus Marcellinus. Valens had left a sizeable guard with his baggage and treasures depleting his force. His right cavalry wing arrived at the Gothic camp sometime before the left wing arrived. It was a very hot day and the Roman cavalry was engaged without strategic support, wasting its efforts while they suffered in the heat.

Meanwhile, Fritigern once again sent an emissary of peace in his continued manipulation of the situation. The resultant delay meant that the Romans present on the field began to succumb to the heat. The army's resources were further diminished when an ill-timed attack by the Roman archers made it necessary to recall Valens' emissary, comes Richomeres. The archers were beaten and retreated in humiliation. Returning from foraging to find the battle in full swing, Gothic cavalry under the command of Alatheus and Saphrax now struck and, in what was probably the most decisive event of the battle, the Roman cavalry fled.

From here, Ammianus gives two accounts of Valens' demise. In the first account, Ammianus states that Valens was "mortally wounded by an arrow, and presently breathed his last breath" (XXXI.12). His body was never found or given a proper burial. In the second account, Ammianus states the Roman infantry was abandoned, surrounded and cut to pieces. Valens was wounded and carried to a small wooden hut. The hut was surrounded by the Goths who put it to the torch, evidently unaware of the prize within. According to Ammianus, this is how Valens perished (XXXI.13.14–6).

A third, apocryphal, account states that Valens was struck in the face by a Gothic dart and then perished while leading a charge. He wore no helmet, in order to encourage his men. This action turned the tide of the battle which resulted in a tactical victory but a strategic loss.

The church historian Socrates likewise gives two accounts for the death of Valens.

Some have asserted that he was burnt to death in a village whither he had retired, which the barbarians assaulted and set on fire. But others affirm that having put off his imperial robe he ran into the midst of the main body of infantry; and that when the cavalry revolted and refused to engage, the infantry were surrounded by the barbarians, and completely destroyed in a body. Among these it is said the Emperor fell, but could not be distinguished, in consequence of his not having on his imperial habit.

When the battle was over, two-thirds of the eastern army lay dead. Many of their best officers had also perished. What was left of the army of Valens was led from the field under the cover of night by comes Richomeres and general Victor.

J. B. Bury, a noted historian of the period, provides a specific interpretation on the significance of the battle: it was "a disaster and disgrace that need not have occurred."

For Rome, the battle incapacitated the government. Emperor Gratian, nineteen years old, was overcome by the debacle, and, until he appointed Theodosius I, unable to deal with the catastrophe, which spread out of control.

The total defeat lost the administration important precious metal resources, as bullion had been centralized with the imperial court.

Legacy 
"Valens was utterly undistinguished, still only a protector, and possessed no military ability: he betrayed his consciousness of inferiority by his nervous suspicion of plots and savage punishment of alleged traitors," writes A. H. M. Jones. But Jones admits that "he was a conscientious administrator, careful of the interests of the humble. Like his brother, he was an earnest Christian." He diminished the oppressive burden of the taxes which had been instituted by Constantine and his sons, and was humbly deferential to his brother in the latter's edicts of reform, as the institution of Defensors (a sort of substitute for the ancient Tribunes, guardians of the lower classes). His moderation and chastity in his private life were everywhere celebrated. At the same time, continuous proscriptions and executions, originating in his weak and fearful disposition, disgraced the dozen years of his reign. "An anxious regard to his personal safety was the ruling principle of the administration of Valens", writes Gibbon. To have died in so inglorious a battle has thus come to be regarded as the nadir of an unfortunate career. This is especially true because of the profound consequences of Valens' defeat. Adrianople spelled the beginning of the end for Roman territorial integrity in the late Empire and this fact was recognized even by contemporaries. Ammianus understood that it was the worst defeat in Roman history since the Battle of Edessa, and Rufinus called it "the beginning of evils for the Roman empire then and thereafter."

Valens is also credited with the commission of a short history of the Roman State. This work, produced by Valens' secretary Eutropius, and known by the name Breviarium ab Urbe condita, tells the story of Rome from its founding. According to some historians, Valens was motivated by the necessity of learning Roman history, that he, the royal family, and their appointees might better mix with the Roman senatorial class.

Religious policy
During his reign, Valens had to confront the theological diversity that was beginning to create division in the Empire. Julian (361–363), had tried to revive the pagan religions. His reactionary attempt took advantage of the dissensions among the different Christian factions, and a largely Pagan rank and file military. However, in spite of broad support, his actions were often viewed as excessive, and before he died in a campaign against the Persians, he was often treated with disdain. His death was considered a sign from Christian God.

Valens was baptised by the Arian bishop of Constantinople before he set out on his first war against the Goths. While the Nicene Christian writers of his time identified Valens with the Arian faction and accused him of persecuting Nicene Christians, modern historians have described both Valens and Valentinian I as primarily interested in maintaining social order and have minimized their theological concerns. Although Athanasius was impelled, under his reign, to briefly go into hiding, Valens maintained a close dependency on his brother Valentinian and treated St. Basil mildly, both of whom supported the Nicene position. Not long after Valens died the cause of Arianism in the Roman East was to come to an end. His successor Theodosius I made Nicene Christianity the state religion of Rome and suppressed the Arians.

Notes

Citations

References

External links
 
 Laws of Valens
 This list of Roman laws of the fourth century shows laws passed by Valens relating to Christianity.

 
328 births
378 deaths
4th-century Arian Christians
4th-century Roman emperors
4th-century Roman consuls
People from Vinkovci
Deified Roman emperors
Gothic War (376–382)
Illyrian people
Imperial Roman consuls
Last of the Romans
Roman emperors killed in battle
Valentinianic dynasty
Roman consuls who died in office
Romans from Pannonia
Illyrian emperors